

Works

French
 Jean Antoine de Baïf, Les Amours de Méline
 Joachim du Bellay, XIII Sonnets de l'honnête amour, influenced by Pontus de Tyard
 Nostradamus, Centuries, a book of prophecies presented in rhymes
 Pierre de Ronsard, France:
 Fifth Book of Odes (see also first four books 1550)
 Les Amours de P. de Ronsard Vandomoys, Ensemble de Bocages, sonnets
 Oeuvres de l'invention de l'Auteur

Other
 Thomas Churchyard, A Myrrour for Man
 Nostradamus, also known as Michel de Notredame or Michel de Nostredame, Centuries, a book of rhymed prophecies

Births
 January 22 – Walter Ralegh, born 1554 according to some sources (executed 1618), English soldier, politician, courtier, explorer, poet, historian and spy
 February 8 – Agrippa d'Aubigné (died 1630), French poet, soldier, propagandist and chronicler
 Also:
 Jean Bertaut (died 1611), French
 Abraham Fleming (died 1607), poet, translator and antiquarian
 Alonso de Ledesma, born this year, according to many sources, or 1562, according to many others (died 1623), Spanish
 Edmund Spenser, born about this year (died 1599), English
 Seyhulislam Yahya (died 1644), Ottoman Empire
 Cvijeta Zuzorić (died 1648), Ragusan

Deaths
 Bernardim Ribeiro  (born 1482), Portuguese
 Satomura Shokyu 里村昌休  (born 1510), Japanese leading master of the linked verse renga after the death of Tani Sobuko in 1545
 Alexander Barclay (born 1476), English/Scottish poet
 Giglio Gregorio Giraldi (born 1479), Italian scholar and poet

Events

See also

 Poetry
 16th century in poetry
 16th century in literature
 Dutch Renaissance and Golden Age literature
 French Renaissance literature
 Renaissance literature
 Spanish Renaissance literature

Notes

16th-century poetry
Poetry